Nino Batsiashvili (born 1 January 1987) is a Georgian chess grandmaster and 4-time and the current Georgian women's chess champion.

In 2012, she won the Group E (women's section of the RSSU Student Grandmaster Cup) of the Moscow Open. In 2013 Batsiashvili won the 3rd Krystyna Hołuj-Radzikowska Memorial in Wrocław, Poland on tiebreak over Joanna Majdan-Gajewska.

In 2015, she won the Women's Georgian Chess Championship and finished second in the Women's European Individual Chess Championship.

She was a member of the Georgian team that won the gold medal in the Women's World Team Chess Championship 2015, held in Chengdu, China. Batsiashvili also won the individual bronze medal on board four.

In December 2015 she drew against reigning world champion Magnus Carlsen in the opening round of the Qatar Masters Open.

In 2016 Batsiashvili took part in the FIDE Women's Grand Prix series. She finished second in the last stage, held in Khanty-Mansiysk, Russia.

In 2018 she was awarded the Grandmaster title.

In 2022 she won an individual gold medal for board 2 at the  Chess Olympiad 2022 in Chennai, India.

References

External links 

Nino Batsiashvili games at 365Chess.com
 

1987 births
Living people
Chess grandmasters
Female chess grandmasters
Chess woman grandmasters
Female chess players from Georgia (country)
Sportspeople from Batumi